COBW domain containing 2 is a protein that in humans is encoded by the CBWD2 gene.

References

Further reading